is a subway station on the Toei Oedo Line in Tokyo, Japan, operated by the Tokyo subway operator Toei Subway.

Lines
Shinjuku-nishiguchi Station is served by the Toei Oedo Line, and is numbered "E-01".

Station layout
The station has one island platform, serving two tracks, located on the 4th basement ("B4F") level. There are two major exits in this station. The north ticket gate leads to various exit points to Oogado Crossing. The south gate leads to the Odakyu Department store area and the Marunouchi Line.

Platforms

History
Shinjuku-nishiguchi Station opened on 12 December 2000.

Passenger statistics
In fiscal 2011, the station was used by an average of 51,059 passengers daily.

Surrounding area
Shinjuku-nishiguchi Station is essentially a satellite station located to the north-west of the main Shinjuku Station interchange. The name "Nishiguchi" means "West Exit" which is where this station's exits are located, relative to Shinjuku Station. While this station is close to the Oedo Line Shinjuku station, it is closer to the Tokyo Metro Marunouchi Line, the Seibu Shinjuku Line, and Shinjuku bus terminal.

 Shinjuku Station
 Seibu Shinjuku Station

See also
 List of railway stations in Japan

References

External links

 Toei Subway station information 

Toei Ōedo Line
Railway stations in Tokyo
Railway stations in Japan opened in 2000